The Second Development Cabinet is the name of the cabinet of the Indonesian government led by President Soeharto and Vice President Sri Sultan Hamengkubuwono IX. This cabinet was announced on March 27, 1973 and served since March 28, 1973 to March 29, 1978.

The Sapta Krida of Second Development Cabinet are as follows:
 Maintaining and enhancing political stability.
 Maintaining and enhancing security and order stability.
 Maintaining and enhancing economic stability.
 Completing Repelita I and then preparing and implementing Repelita II.
 Improving people's welfare.
 Improving the order and utilization of apparatus.
 Holding general elections at the end of 1977.

During this cabinet period, The Second Pelita began (1 April 1974 – 31 March 1979). The targets to be achieved at this time are food, clothing, housing, facilities and infrastructure, welfare for the people, and expanding employment opportunities. The Second Pelita succeeded in increasing the economic growth of an average population of 7% a year. Improvements in terms of irrigation. There was also an increase in production in the industrial sector. Then many roads and bridges were rehabilitated and built.

Also during this cabinet period, the Malari incident (Fifteenth of January Catastrophe) occurred on January 15-16, 1974 which coincided with the arrival of Japanese Prime Minister Tanaka Kakuei to Indonesia.

Cabinet Leaders

Cabinet Members

Ministers 
The following are the ministers of the Second Development Cabinet.

Official with ministerial rank 
The following are ministerial-level officials in the Second Development Cabinet.

Notes

References

Book 
 
 Winarno, Bondan. 2013. J.B. Sumarlin Cabe Rawit yang Lahir di Sawah. Jakarta: PT Kompas Media Nusantara

Newspapers and others 

New Order (Indonesia)
Cabinets of Indonesia
1973 establishments in Indonesia
1978 disestablishments in Indonesia
Cabinets established in 1973
Cabinets disestablished in 1978
Suharto